Millbrook High School can refer to:

 Millbrook High School (New York), a public high school in Millbrook, New York
 Millbrook High School (North Carolina), Raleigh, North Carolina
 Millbrook High School (Virginia), Winchester, Virginia

See also
 Millbrook Community School, a secondary school, Southampton, England
 Millbrook School, a private, coeducational secondary school, Millbrook, New York